The white-headed dwarf gecko or painted dwarf gecko (Lygodactylus picturatus) is a species of Lygodactylus gecko widely distributed in Africa.

One subspecies is recognized, in addition to the nominate one: Lygodactylus picturatus sudanensis Loveridge, 1935, the Sudani dwarf gecko.

References

Lygodactylus
Reptiles of West Africa
Reptiles of Cameroon
Reptiles of the Central African Republic
Reptiles of the Democratic Republic of the Congo
Reptiles of Ethiopia
Reptiles of Kenya
Reptiles of Mozambique
Reptiles of Somalia
Reptiles of South Sudan
Vertebrates of Sudan
Reptiles of Uganda
Reptiles of Tanzania
Reptiles of Zimbabwe
Reptiles of Zambia
Reptiles described in 1871
Taxa named by Wilhelm Peters